Jembulat Boletoqo was a Circassian military commander, politician, nobleman and leader of the Temirgoy region. He was one of the most influential figures in the Russo-Circassian War. He had a big influence on the entire Trans-Kuban region. He was famous for his courage and tough will. He had great influence among all Circassians, including the Abadzekhs, with whom he was associated with.

Hailing from the Temirgoy (КIэмыргъуэй) tribe and being the son of Aytech Khatajuq, he was born into a wealthy princely clan which held massive influence in the trans-kuban region.

Family name 
The princely family Boletoqo inherited its last name and the title of “Prince of Princes” from its legendary ancestor, Boletoqo, who was famous for his “wisdom and strictness”.

Personality 
His personality has invariably attracted the attention of historiographers of the Caucasian War. According to KF Stahl, he “had a tremendous influence on the entire Trans-Kuban region. He was famous for his courage, strong character and tough will".

V. A. Potto: "With fearlessness he combined an extraordinary gift of eloquence, an astute mind, an iron will ... Whole legends circulated about him, and folk bards praised his deeds in their songs."

Life 
At the beginning of the 19th century, the population of the Temirgoy principality was about 30,000 people. The eldest prince of the Boletoqo family inherited the title of the Great Prince. Since the birth of Jembulat, the political situation inside the Temirgoy principality was highly unstable because it was situated between two great powers in the region, the Russian and Ottoman Empires.

Jembulat Boletoqo led an 800 strong cavalry force into Russian territory. Half of the detachment was of Hajjrets under the command of 18 year old Kabardian prince Ismail Kasei. Only one Cossack regiment decided to fight the rising Circassian army on October 23 at the village of Sabl on the Barsukly River. Jembulat's forces surrounded the Cossacks and killed all of them in a saber attack.

In the summer of 1825, Russian forces carried out several military operations. On August 18, General Veliaminov burned the residency of Hajji Tlam, one of the elderly supporters of the Circassian resistance in Abadzekh, and killed his entire family. On January 31, Jembulat burned down the fortress of Marevskoye as revenge.

He took part in the Russo-Turkish War (1828–1829) as an ally of the Turks and he repeatedly made devastating raids against the Russians. On June 4, 1828, Jembulat Boletoqo started his campaign into Russian lands with 2,000 cavalry under five flags of different Circassian principalities, as well as a Turkish flag as a symbol of their loyalty to Islam. On June 6, at the fortress Batalpashinsk, Jembulat attacked the Khopyor Cossack regiment, one of the biggest on the Kuban Military Line.

Jembulat left the local Russian forces behind him and moved forward. The Russians concluded that he intended to go to Kabarda in the middle of the Russian-Turkish war, and open a second front on the Terek and Sunja Rivers. Magomed-Aga, a high ranking Turk, was present in the Circassian army.

Earl Paskevich, the Russian commander-in-chief in the Caucasus, ordered the 2nd Ulan division, returning from the Russia-Iran war, to move along the Georgian Military Road to cut off the route of the Circassians toward Kabarda. The 40th Eger battalion marched from Kabarda toward Jembulat. Yet, Jembulat suddenly changed his direction and headed toward the town of Georgievsk, the Russian administrative center in the Caucasus.

The Circassian army stopped on a high hill at a distance from the Marinskaya fortress. Jembulat menaced the Volzhskiy regiment's left flank with all his forces, and won the battle.

Circassian political analyst Khan-Giray observed that the situation changed for Great-Prince Jembulat “after the field marshal Paskevich left the region”. The new commander-in-chief, Baron Rosen, did not believe in human rights of the indigenous Circassians.

In 1832, he tried to help Kabardia resist against Russian occupation, but failed.

In October 1836, Grigory Zass sent Jembulat Boletoqo word that he would like to make peaceful negotiations. If he came to a Russian fortress for explanation, he would be assassinated; in case he did not come, the Russians would claim that he was a warmonger.

Boletoqo came to Zass’ residency. Zass was not there for his first visit. Zass sent him a letter and told to come at an exact date when he would certainly be in his residency. Accepting the proposal, in the summer of 1837, on his way to the Prochnyi Okop fortress, Boletoqo was killed by a Russian sniper who was hiding in the forest on the Russian bank of the Kuban River at the intersection with the Urup River. According to a witness, upon his death, Jembulat said the name of Zass.

References 

Circassian nobility
Year of birth unknown
1836 deaths
North Caucasian independence activists
People of the Caucasian War
Circassian military personnel of the Russo-Circassian War